Das Wunder der Heliane (German for The Miracle of Heliane), Op. 20 is an opera in three acts by Erich Wolfgang Korngold with a libretto by Hans Müller-Einigen, after . It was first performed at the Hamburg State Opera on 7 October 1927. A suite for violin and piano based on the music from the aria "Ich ging zu ihm" is in print at Schott publishing.

After many successful premieres across Germany, Korngold composed this new opera beginning in 1924. Before its premiere in 1927 Korngold claimed that this would be his masterwork.

Performance history
At the world premiere in Hamburg the audiences and critics were unimpressed, feeling that Korngold's music held no new surprises and it was not modern. Critics were united in their lack of esteem for the work, many simply dismissing it as kitsch.

According to Brendan G. Carroll's article in the Grove Dictionary, Das Wunder der Heliane is arguably Korngold's greatest opera. Even though it might not have been as popular as his previous Die tote Stadt, within the artistic community there is evidence that there was admiration for the work, soprano Lotte Lehman even stating that the title role was her favorite.

It was presented at the Berlin Städtische Oper under Bruno Walter in 1928, but Heliane was forgotten for some time.  However, it was revived in the 21st century with high-profile performances in London and a recording and performance at the BBC's Proms of the opera's most famous musical sequence, "Ich ging zu ihm", sung by soprano Renée Fleming plus the release of the aria on Fleming's studio album.

In 2010 it was given at the Kaiserslautern Pfalztheater, under Uwe Sandner, directed by   Johannes Reitmeier, and set designer Daniel Dvorak, plus costume designer Thomas Dörfler.  Its cast included: Sally du Randt (Heliane), Derrick Lawrence (Der Herrscher), Norbert Schmittberg (Der Fremde), Silvia Hablowetz (Die Botin), Alexis Wagner (Der Pförtner), Hans-Jörg Bock (Der blinde Scharfrichter), Alexandru Popescu (Der junge Mensch), Jung-Baik Seok, Michael McBride, Roland Goroll, Hubertus Bohrer, Eric Erlandsen, Miroslav Maj (Die sechs Richter), Elena Laborenz, and Galina Putintseva (Die seraphischen Stimmen).

In September 2017, a production at Opera Vlaanderen opened, directed by David Bösch and conducted by Alexander Joel with sets and costumes by Christof Hetzer. Its cast includes: Ausrine Stundyte (Heliane), Tómas Tómasson (Der Herrscher), Ian Storey (Der Fremde), Natascha Petrinsky (Die Botin), Denzil Delaere (Der Schwertrichter) and Markus Suihkonen (Der Pförtner).

The U.S. premiere took place 2019 at Bard College, New York, as part of the Thirtieth Annual Bard Music Festival. Leon Botstein conducted the American Symphony Orchestra in a production staged by Christian Räth.

Roles

Synopsis
Place: An unnamed totalitarian state
Time:  In an unknown era.

Act 1
The cruel Ruler exercises his power over the land. The Ruler suffers because he is unable to win the love of his wife Heliane. Since he is unhappy, he will not tolerate his subjects living in happiness. A young Stranger had recently arrived in the land and was bringing the people joy; as a result, he was arrested and sentenced to death. He will be executed at sunrise. The Ruler visits him in order to learn the reason for his actions. The Stranger pleads for mercy but the Ruler is firm on his death. However, he agrees to allow the Stranger to remain unchained this last night of his life. When her husband has left, Heliane comes to the cell to comfort the Stranger. As she speaks to the Stranger and realizes his goodness, her feelings of pity and sadness turn to love.
The Stranger tells Heliane how beautiful she is and she reveals to him her long golden hair. She then exposes her bare feet and then, finally, stands completely naked before him. The Stranger asks Heliane to give herself to him on his last night of life, but she refuses and goes to the chapel to pray for the Stranger. The Ruler returns to the cell, proposing that if the Stranger can teach Heliane to love the Ruler then he will spare his life and concede Heliane to him. Heliane returns, still naked. She is shocked to meet her husband in the cell. In anger, he orders the Stranger's death and Heliane's trial.

Act 2
The Ruler and his messenger (also his former lover whom he has rejected) await the coming of the executioner and the members of the high court. Heliane will be tried when the six judges and the blind Chief Justice arrive. The Ruler accuses her of adultery with the Stranger. Heliane cannot deny that she stood naked before the Stranger, but she insists that she gave herself to him in thought only. The Ruler presses his dagger into her breast telling her she should kill herself. The Stranger is brought in to testify but he will not speak, wanting to be left alone for a few moments with Heliane. He kisses her and then takes the dagger and kills himself, making it impossible for the Ruler to prove that Heliane is lying.  The Ruler dismisses the court and tells Heliane that she will be on trial before God: if she is innocent, as she claims, she must bring the Stranger back to life. Shocked, she agrees to undergo the trial.

Act 3
A crowd has assembled outside of the Ruler's palace. The Judges, together with the Chief Justice arrive to witness Heliane's attempt to bring the Stranger back to life. The messenger stirs up the crowd against Heliane as the test begins. She cries, she will not lie, admitting that she did love the young Stranger. When the Ruler sees her cry he wants to save her, but only on the condition that she will be his. Heliane resents her husband more than ever and she refuses this last offer for life. The crowd drags her away to the stake where she will die. Suddenly all are shocked as a thunder crashes. Just as suddenly, stars begin to appear in the sky and everyone is amazed to see the young Stranger's corpse rise, transfigured from the funeral bier. By some miracle he is alive. Heliane breaks away from the shocked crowd and runs into the arms of this Stranger whom she loves. In a fit of rage the Ruler plunges his sword into her breast. The Stranger offers a blessing to the people and banishes the ruler whose power is broken. The Stranger takes Heliane in his arms. United in their love they rise to heaven.

Recordings
Nicolai Gedda, Andreas Scholz, Anna Tomowa-Sintow, Gotthold Schwarz, Hartmut Welker, John de Haan, et al. Conductor: John Mauceri, Berlin Radio Symphony Orchestra. 3x CD, DDD, Decca, part of the "Entartete Musik" series.
Annemarie Kremer (soprano), Ian Storey (tenor), Aris Argiris (baritone), Katerina Hebelková (alto), Nuttaporn Thammathi (tenor), Conductor Fabrice Bollon. Philharmonisches Orchester Freiburg, Opernchor des Theater Freiburg, Extrachor des Theater Freiburg, Freiburg Bach Choir. Recorded at the Rolf-Böhme-Saal, Konzerthaus Freiburg, Germany, 20–26 July 2017. Naxos
Video recording: Sara Jakubiak (Helene), Brian Jagde (The Stranger), Josef Wagner (The Ruler), Okka von der Damerau (The Messenger), Derek Welton (The Doorman), Burkhard Ulrich (The Blind Judge), Gideon Poppe (The Young Man), Chorus and Orchestra of the Deutsche Oper Berlin, conductor: Marc Albrecht, (stage director: Christof Loy), 2018 Deutsche Oper Berlin, Naxos DVD and BD 2019.

References
Sources
 (Author unknown), "The Inspired Idea", Opera magazine, November 2007, p. 1310
 Adam, Thomas, Germany and the Americas, p. 624

External links
Synopsis @ Korngold Society
Information @ Schott Music (GER)
Recording of "Ich ging zu ihm" by Lotte Lehmann
 Synopsis in German and English

Operas by Erich Wolfgang Korngold
German-language operas
Operas
1927 operas
Opera world premieres at the Hamburg State Opera